Loukas Louka (born 17 April 1978 in Larnaca, Cyprus) is a Cypriot football defender who played for Anorthosis Famagusta FC. He also played in Greece for Ethnikos Asteras.

Louka has made 21 appearances for the Cyprus national football team.

References

External links
 

Living people
1978 births
AEK Larnaca FC players
Alki Larnaca FC players
Anorthosis Famagusta F.C. players
Ethnikos Asteras F.C. players
Cypriot footballers
Cyprus international footballers
Association football defenders
People from Larnaca